The Invasion of the Kuril Islands was the World War II Soviet military operation to capture the Kuril Islands from Japan in 1945. The invasion, part of the Soviet–Japanese War, was decided on when plans to land on Hokkaido were abandoned. The successful military operations of the Red Army at Mutanchiang and during the invasion of South Sakhalin created the necessary prerequisites for invasion of the Kuril Islands.

Order of battle
Soviet Union
2nd Far Eastern Front
87th Rifle Corps 
355th Rifle Division
113th Separate Rifle Brigade
56th Rifle Corps 
2nd Rifle Brigade
Kamchatka Defense Area
101st Rifle Division
Separate Rifle Regiment
128th Composite Air Division (78 aircraft)
Soviet Pacific Fleet (operating from Paul naval base)
60 ships and vessels including transports
2nd Independent Naval Aviation Bomber Regiment 
Coastal Artillery battery
365th Marine Battalion
60th Border Guards Detachment
Imperial Japan
5th IJA Area Army
IJA 27th Army
91st Infantry Division
73rd Infantry Brigade
74th Infantry Brigade
11th Tank Regiment
89th Infantry Division
31st Air Defence Regiment (Shumshu)
41st Mixed Regiment 
129th Infantry Brigade

Battle
The operation took place between 18 August and 1 September. The attack was made by the 87th Rifle Corps (Guards Lieutenant General A. S. Ksenofontov) of the 16th Army (Lieutenant General Leonty Cheremisov) from the 2nd Far Eastern Front, and elements of the Kamchatka Defense Area (Major General Alexey Gnechko commanding). Ships and transportation were drawn from the Petropavlovsk military base (Captain Dmitry Ponomarev). The 128th Aviation Division also provided support.

The islands were occupied by the Japanese 91st Infantry Division (Shiashkotan, Paramushir, Shumshu, and Onekotan), 42nd Division (Simushir), 41st Independent Regiment (Matua), 129th Independent Brigade (Urup), and 89th Infantry Division (Iturup and Kunashir). The Japanese commander was Lieutenant General Fusaki Tsutsumi.

Initial reconnaissance was undertaken on 18 August by a detachment of the 113th Separate Rifle Brigade (Captain-Lieutenant G. I. Brunshtein), carried by two mine trawlers (ТЩ-589 and ТЩ-590) to Rubetzu Bay on Iturup island. The landings on Iturup were continued by the 355th Rifle Division, which also landed on the smaller island of Urup.

On 23 August, the 20,000-strong Japanese garrisons on the islands were ordered to surrender as part of the general surrender of Japan. However, some of the garrison forces ignored this order and continued to resist Soviet occupation.

From 22 to 28 August, troops of the Kamchatka Defense Area occupied the Kuril Islands from Urup north.

On 1 September, elements of the 87th Rifle Corps were landed by torpedo boats, mine trawlers and transports (departing from Otomari) on Kunashir and Shikotan in the southern Kuril Islands. This was an assault landing against Japanese resistance. On 4 September, 87th Rifle Corps occupied five smaller islands (Sibotzu, Taraku-Shima, Uri-Shima, Akiuri, and Suiseto).

After 4 September, Soviet forces occupied the rest of the Kuril Islands without further resistance.

The islands remained part of Russia after the dissolution of the Soviet Union, but their true legal status remains in question as part of the Kuril Islands dispute between Russia, Japan, and other parties.

See also
 Battle of Shumshu
 Japanese evacuation of Karafuto and the Kuril Islands

References

Kuril Islands
Military operations involving the Soviet Union
Japan–Soviet Union relations
Kuril Islands
1945 in Japan
1945 in the Soviet Union
Conflicts in 1945
Kuril Islands
Amphibious operations of World War II
August 1945 events in Asia
September 1945 events in Asia
Military operations involving Japan